A shell keep is a style of medieval fortification, best described as a stone structure circling the top of a motte.

In English castle morphology, shell keeps are perceived as the successors to motte-and-bailey castles, with the  wooden fence around the top of the motte replaced by a stone wall. Castle engineers during the Norman period did not trust the motte to support the enormous weight of a stone keep. A common solution was to replace the palisade with a stone wall then build wooden buildings backing onto the inside of the wall. This construction was lighter than a keep and prevented the walls from being undermined, meaning they could be thinner and lighter.

A gazetteer compiled by archaeologist Robert Higham counted 21 shell keeps in England and Wales. Examples include the Round Tower at Windsor Castle and the majority were built in the 11th and 12th centuries.

Surviving English examples of shell keeps include:

 Arundel, West Sussex (re-modelled post-medieval)
 Berkhampstead, Hertfordshire
 Carisbrooke, Isle of Wight
 Castle Acre, Norfolk (shell keep around an inner tower or manor House)
 Clare, Suffolk (part of wall on motte only)
 Fotheringhay, Northamptonshire (demolished - motte only survives)
 Launceston, Cornwall
 Lewes, East Sussex, - two shell keeps on same site? One survives
 Lincoln, Lincolnshire - two shell keeps on same site? One survives 
 Oxford, Oxfordshire
 Pickering, North Yorkshire
 Restormel, Cornwall (excellent example)
 Tamworth, Staffordshire
 Tonbridge, Kent (foundations on motte only)
 Totnes, Devon
 Trematon, Cornwall
 Warwick, shell demolished and incorporated into bailey wall post-medieval
 Wigmore, Herefordshire
 Windsor, Berkshire (re-modelled post-medieval)
 Wiston (Wales)

In addition Farnham and Berkeley castles have stone enclosed mottes which may be interpreted as shell keep variations. At other sites such as Durham, Warkworth, Clifford's Tower (York) and Sandal (Wakefield), shell keeps may have evolved into a tower proper. Clifford's Tower is often interpreted by modern visitors as a shell keep due to explosion damage, in 1684, which removed the roof and its central supporting masonry. True shell keeps were a stone wall around the upper perimeter of the motte with lean-to buildings against this outer wall and a small courtyard in the middle. See Restormel plan below.

Unusually Lewes and Lincoln castles both feature two separate mottes which may have had shell keeps upon both of them. The reason for this is unclear but given that Lincoln Castle is adjacent to the cathedral, one shell keep may have been for the castellan (castle holder) and the other for the bishop. In each case, only one shell keep survives.

Notes

References

 

Castle architecture